The Astronut Show is an animated TV series, produced by the Terrytoons animation studio.  It first aired on August 23, 1965.  Each episode included an episode of Astronut, Hashimoto-san, and Luno The White Stallion.

Astronut first appeared on the Deputy Dawg series.  He is a squat, childlike, short, friendly green alien in a tiny flying saucer who frequently gets into mischief on Earth. He has a human friend called Oscar Mild, who was, as his name suggested, a soft-spoken character. Oscar works in an office for Mr. Nicely, whose temperament is the exact opposite of his name.

The series was directed by Art Bartsch, Bob Kuwahara, Connie Rasinski, and David Tendlar.  The writers were Larz Bourne, Glan Heish, Tom Morrison, and Bob Ogle.  Voices were provided by Dayton Allen and Bob McFadden.

The Astronut Cartoons were originally produced b Terrytoons for theatrical distribution by 20th Century Fox from 1964 to 1966. Starting in  1966 the cartoons were solely made for television. In 1989 Video Treasures released three VHS Tapes, two included all of the theatrical cartoons and the third had some of the made-for-tv cartoons.

Astronut theatrical cartoons and VHS tape#	                   
1964
   	Brother from Outer Space	TT 2601
	    Oscar's Moving Day	        TT 2601
	    Kisser Plant	            TT 2601
	    Outer Galaxy Gazette	    TT 2601
	    Molecular Mixup	            TT 2601
	    Hokey Home Movies	        TT 2601
1965
   	Sky's the Limit, The	    TT 2602
	    Weather Magic	            TT 2602
	    Robots in Toyland	        TT 2600
	    Twinkle Twinkle Little Telstar	TT 2600
1966
   	Gems for Gemini	            TT 2602
	    Haunted Housekeeping

Astronut TV cartoons released on VHS
1966
        Oscar's Birthday Present    TT 2600
        Jolly Jupiter               TT 2600
        No Space Like Home          TT 2600
        Martian Recipe              TT 2600
        Martian Moochers            TT 2602
        Oscar's Thinking Cap        TT 2602
        The Invisibeam              TT 2602

References

External links

Astronut at Don Markstein's Toonopedia. Archived from the original on April 6, 2012.

1960s American animated television series
1965 American television series debuts
1966 American television series endings
American children's animated comic science fiction television series
Animated television series about extraterrestrial life
Television series by CBS Studios
Television series by Terrytoons
Television series about alien visitations